Vepalimomab is an experimental mouse monoclonal antibody intended for the treatment of inflammations. It blocks vascular adhesion protein 1. Development of the drug was discontinued in 2002.

References 

Monoclonal antibodies
Abandoned drugs